Joan Swenson (July 9, 1915 – January 29, 2005), previously known as Joan Tompkins, was an American actress of television, film, radio, and stage.

Career
Tompkins performed with stock theater companies in Mount Kisco, New York and White Plains, New York. She acted on Broadway in My Sister Eileen, Pride and Prejudice, and Fly Away Home.

Her roles on radio programs include:

Her television roles included:
Adventures in Paradise as Cora Summers in "Assassins" (1961)
Hazel as Florence Gurney in "Hazel and the Gardener" (1962)
The New Breed as Mrs. Marsh in "How Proud the Guilty" (1962)
Bus Stop, as Sarah Jenkins in "The Runaways" (1961) and unknown role in "I Kiss Your Shadow" (1962)
The Danny Thomas Show, two episodes (1959 and 1962)
The Lieutenant, two episodes  (1963–1964)
Route 66, as Mrs. Thomas in "Between Hello and Goodbye" (1962)
The Travels of Jaimie McPheeters as Martha Pollux in "The Day of the Wizard" (1964)
The Eleventh Hour, three episodes, including the two-parter, "Does My Mother Have to Know?", in the role of Aggie Britt (1964)
Mr. Novak as Mrs. Douglas Morgan, Sr., in "The Private Life of Douglas Morgan, Jr." (1964) 
Gomer Pyle, U.S.M.C. as Mrs. Harper in "A Date for the Colonel's Daughter" (1964)
Perry Mason, three episodes (1962–1964)
Dr. Kildare, three episodes (1962–1965)
Slattery's People, as Dorothy Ralston in "Question, What Time Is the Next Bandwagon?" (1965)
The Farmer's Daughter in "Katie's Castle" (1965)
My Three Sons reoccurring as Lorraine Miller (1967-1970)
Mannix as Mrs. Dover in "Turn Every Stone" (1967)
Mission: Impossible as Miss Putnam in "The Seal" (1967)
Occasional Wife as Mrs. Brahms in "Pilot" and "No Cookie for Dessert" (1966) 
I Dream of Jeannie as General's wife in "Invisible House for Sale" (1968)
Bewitched as Harriet Walters in "Once in a Vial" (1968)
The Brady Bunch as Mrs. Tyler in "The Honeymoon" (1969) which was that show's premiere episode
Lassie, in two episodes, including the role of Mrs. Davis in the 1964 episode "The Little Christmas Tree" and as Katherine in the 1971 segment entitled "The Awakening"
The Mary Tyler Moore Show, as Mrs. Thorn, secretary to Lou Grant, episode "Who's in Charge Here?" (1972)
Griff, as Ruth in "Elephant in a Cage" (1973)
Owen Marshall: Counselor at Law, three episodes, including two as a judge (1973–1974)
Barnaby Jones, three episodes, including role of Judge Edith Royce in "Voice in the Night" (1976)
The Waltons, as Mrs. Herbert in "The Achievement" (1977), the final appearance of Richard Thomas in the series and the episode in which John-Boy Walton he obtains publication of his first novel
Emergency! as Maggie Trigg in "The Most Deadly Passage" (1978), made into a television movie the following year

Personal life
On July 25, 1936, Tompkins married actor Stephen Ker Appleby in Briarcliff, New York. They were divorced on December 4, 1941.

References

External links
 
 

1915 births
2005 deaths
Actresses from Los Angeles
People from Dana Point, California
Actresses from New York (state)
American television actresses
American film actresses
American radio actresses
American stage actresses
Place of birth missing
20th-century American actresses
21st-century American women